Antony Alfred Lyttelton, 2nd Viscount Chandos (23 October 1920 – 28 November 1980) was a British soldier and peer from the Lyttelton family.

Biography
Lord Chandos was the son of Oliver Lyttelton, 1st Viscount Chandos, and Lady Moira Godolphin Osborne, a daughter of George Osborne, 10th Duke of Leeds. He was educated at Eton and Trinity College, Cambridge.  Chandos served in the General Staff during World War II in the Mediterranean from 1942–45, where he was mentioned in dispatches. In 1950 Chandos joined the stockbrokers Panmure Gordon & Co. where he stayed until 1975.

Marriage and children
Chandos married Caroline Mary Lascelles, daughter of Sir Alan Lascelles, on 20 May 1949. They had two sons and two daughters:

 Hon Laura Katherine Lyttelton (born 18 May 1950)
 Thomas Orlando Lyttelton, 3rd Viscount Chandos, Baron Lyttelton of Aldershot (life peerage), (born 12 February 1953).  
 Hon Matthew Peregrine Antony Lyttelton (born 21 April 1956)
 Hon Deborah Claire Lyttelton (born 18 September 1963)

Lord Chandos died in 1980 and was succeeded in the viscountcy by his elder son, Thomas.

External links

1920 births
1980 deaths
Alumni of Trinity College, Cambridge
Antony
People educated at Eton College
Viscounts in the Peerage of the United Kingdom